The 2017 season was the Arizona Cardinals' 98th in the National Football League, their 30th in Arizona and their 12th at University of Phoenix Stadium. It was also the fifth and final season under head coach Bruce Arians. The Cardinals played one road game in London at Twickenham Stadium against the Los Angeles Rams as one of the NFL London Games. They improved on a 7–8–1 season they had in 2016, finishing 8–8 as they spent most of the season alternating between wins and losses. However, they missed the playoffs for the second straight season.

Offseason

Signings

Departures

Draft

Notes
 The Cardinals received one compensatory selection — No. 179 overall.

Staff

Final roster

Preseason

Regular season

Schedule

Note: Intra-division opponents are in bold text.

Game summaries

Week 1: at Detroit Lions

The Cardinals would lose star running back David Johnson to a wrist injury during the game. Afterwards, it was revealed that his dislocated his wrist, an injury that sent him to injured reserve on September 12 and would eventually keep him out for the rest of the season.

Week 2: at Indianapolis Colts

For the first time in 5 years, head coach Bruce Arians made a return to Indianapolis, where he served as quarterback's coach from 1998-2000, as offensive coordinator in 2012, and that same year, served as interim head coach of the Colts, where he led them to a 9-3 record, the best record held by an interim head coach in NFL history.

Week 3: vs. Dallas Cowboys

Week 4: vs. San Francisco 49ers

Week 5: at Philadelphia Eagles

Week 6: vs. Tampa Bay Buccaneers

This was the debut of recently acquired veteran running back Adrian Peterson. He'd have a hot day that contributed to a Cardinal victory, rushing 26 times for 134 yards and 2 touchdowns. The performance would earn him NFC Offensive Player of the Week.

Week 7: at Los Angeles Rams
NFL London Games

The Cardinals lost Carson Palmer to an arm injury during the game. Shortly after, it was revealed that he broke his arm and would be out for the remainder of the season. It was also his last game he'd ever play in the NFL.

Week 9: at San Francisco 49ers

The Cardinals swept the 49ers for the third consecutive season.

Week 10: vs. Seattle Seahawks

Week 11: at Houston Texans

Week 12: vs. Jacksonville Jaguars

Week 13: vs. Los Angeles Rams

Week 14: vs. Tennessee Titans

Week 15: at Washington Redskins

Week 16: vs. New York Giants

Week 17: at Seattle Seahawks

The Seahawks lost four out of five home games versus the Bruce Arians-led Cardinals; this one, combined with the Atlanta Falcons winning, eliminated Seattle for the first time since 2011. In what would be head coach Bruce Arians' final game as Cardinals head coach, Arians recorded his 50th win with the Cardinals and became the winningest head coach in Cardinals history, surpassing Ken Whisenhunt, who won 49 games during his tenure with the Cardinals (2007–2012).

Standings

Division

Conference

References

External links
 

Arizona
Arizona Cardinals seasons
Arizona Cardinals